Vasiliki Kasapi (Original: Βασιλική Κασάπη, born  in Thessaloniki) was a Greek female weightlifter, competing in the +75 kg category and representing Greece at international competitions. 

She participated at the 2004 Summer Olympics in the +75 kg event. 
She competed at world championships, most recently at the 2007 World Weightlifting Championships.

She was caught and sanctioned for using the forbidden substances methyltrienolone and buprenorphine.

Major results

References

External links
 
Vasiliki Kasapi at Sports Reference
http://www.womenofchina.cn/womenofchina/html1/4/9880-1.htm
http://www.mediterraneanweightlifting.it/index.php?option=com_content&view=article&catid=1&id=105&Itemid=69 
http://grg51.typepad.com/steroid_nation/2008/08/nathan-baggaley.html
http://www.olympicweightlifting.eu/2001-world-weightlifting-women-over-75-kg/

1983 births
Living people
Greek female weightlifters
Weightlifters at the 2004 Summer Olympics
Olympic weightlifters of Greece
Sportspeople from Thessaloniki
Doping cases in weightlifting
21st-century Greek women